A fartura is a doughnut made of flour, yeast, baking soda, salt, sugar, cinnamon and water, that is fried in oil, in the form of a roll and traditionally sold at fairs in Portugal. It is preferable to consume them when they are hot so that the crunchy surface does not harden.

Origins
Fartura comes from the Latin root ‘farto,’ meaning full or satiated.

One theory is that the Portuguese, when trading in the Far East, would have brought with them new cooking techniques, including modifying the dough of Youtiao, also known as Youzagwei, in southern China. However, they would have changed the aspect to the star shape, because they did not learn the Chinese technique of "pulling" the dough (the Chinese emperor made it a crime with the death penalty if anyone shared knowledge with foreigners). As a result, the abundances are not "pulled" but extruded from a star-shaped mold.

Another theory is that farturas may have been an adaptation of the Spanish churros, which were created by shepherds as a substitute for foods made with fresh pasta. Churro dough was easy to produce and fry over an open fire in the mountains, where shepherds lived most of the time.

The food is part of the Arab influence in Portuguese cuisine, in using sugar instead of honey for sweetening. The fartura is a development of the original Arab zalabiya.

References

Portuguese cuisine
Doughnuts
Fried dough
Sweet breads
Unleavened breads